Floy Agnes "Aggie" (Naranjo Stroud) Lee was a biologist who worked on the Manhattan Project at Los Alamos as a hematology technician.

Early life 
Floy Agnes Lee was born July 23, 1922 at the Albuquerque Indian School and was the fourth of five siblings. Lee's mother was a German-American teacher from Indiana who had traveled in the US teaching at different Indian schools including the Winnebago Indian schools in Wisconsin, in Santa Fe, and at the Albuquerque Indian School. Lee's father was a member of the Santa Clara Pueblo. Lee grew up at the Albuquerque Indian School, but was sent to St. Mary’s Catholic School for her education. Lee then went on to graduate from Albuquerque High School. In 1945, Lee graduated from the University of New Mexico (UNM) with a degree in biology. While there, Lee worked for a professor putting different solutions into each plant to see how they grew. This job made her more interested in doing research. During her college years she also learned to fly planes and worked at a grocery store to pay for flying lessons. She was one flight short of qualifying to become a member of the Women’s Airforce Service Pilots before the program was disbanded in 1944.

In 1945, Lee was asked by professor Edward Castetter, head of UNM's biology department, to do research for him. While Lee was compiling and recording information on what the Indigenous people of New Mexico ate before colonization, Castetter asked her to postpone a trip that she had planned to see her mother's relatives in order to finish the research. While Lee was continuing this research, Castetter got a call from Los Alamos. They told him that they were looking for a biology student or a graduate to work in the hematology laboratory.

Manhattan Project 
Lee accepted this position at the hematology lab at Los Alamos in 1945. She collected and examined blood samples from Manhattan Project scientists, including  Louis Hempelmann, as well as Louis Slotin and Alvin Graves after the criticality accident that exposed Slotin to a fatal dose of radiation. Lee said that she learned how to take blood, read blood cell counts, and identify blood types on the job, but that she excelled at these tasks once taught. Lee was sent to different sites of the Manhattan Project where she would draw blood from individuals. While working in the hematology lab at Los Alamos, Lee was assigned specific scientists to monitor, including Enrico Fermi. 

Lee and Fermi became friends during this time. In Lee's oral history, conducted by the Atomic Heritage Foundation, she elaborated on her relationship with Fermi: "We [Lee and Fermi] got to talking about what I liked to do and what he liked to, and we got on the subject of tennis. Now, I did not know that this was Enrico Fermi. I only knew him as a number, because they wouldn’t give names out. So we would play tennis. This was before the bomb was dropped, and then afterwards also. He was a short man, and he had a funny little hat." After the atomic bombs were detonated over Hiroshima and Nagasaki, Lee was told that she had been playing tennis with a Nobel-Prize winner for months. She was shocked. Lee said that her response was: "'Oh, I can’t believe that.' Because I was beating him in tennis every time. So when we went out to play tennis later, I didn’t beat him. I tried not to. We became very, very good friends."

Post-war career 
After the war ended, Fermi encouraged Lee to continue her studies at the University of Chicago. She moved to Chicago, began her doctorate in biology, and worked at Argonne National Laboratory. Lee continued to study, work at the lab and raise her child after her husband passed away from cancer. After 14 years, she received her PhD. She later worked at the Jet Propulsion Lab in California and returned to work at Los Alamos National Laboratory before she retired. Over the course of her long career, she conducted research on the impact of radiation on chromosomes.

Lee died in 2018 at the age of 95.

References

External links 

 Floy Agnes Lee's Interview (Oral History), Voices of the Manhattan Project
Floy Agnes Lee's Obituary, American Association for Cancer Research
Floy Agnes Lee's Obituary, Santa Fe New Mexican

Hematologists
University of Chicago alumni
University of New Mexico alumni
Native American scientists
20th-century Native American women
20th-century Native Americans
1922 births
2018 deaths
Women biologists
Manhattan Project people
Radiation health effects researchers
Women on the Manhattan Project
Los Alamos National Laboratory personnel
21st-century Native American women
21st-century Native Americans
Native American women scientists